Miri Hospital is a 349-bedded main secondary referral hospital in the northern region of Sarawak, Malaysia. Miri Hospital serves as a medical hub for a population of 1.5 million people. Miri Hospital caters not only to the people of Miri district, but also the districts and sub-districts of Limbang, Lawas, Marudi, Ulu Baram, Niah, Sibuti, Bekenu, Suai, Long Lama, Bakelalan and Bario highlands.

History

Ground breaking for the hospital extension project was done on 28 October 2020.

References

Miri, Malaysia
Hospitals in Sarawak